Jhunjhunu Assembly constituency is one of constituencies of Rajasthan Legislative Assembly in the Jhunjhunu (Lok Sabha constituency).

Jhunujhunu Constituency cavers all voters from parts of Jhunjhunu tehsil, which include ILRC Jhunjhunu including Jhunjhunu Municipal Board and Bagar Municipal Board; and ILRC Kulod Kalan, and parts of Chirawa tehsil which include Chanana, Solana, Kishorepura, Kithana, Sultana and Sari of ILRC Sultana.

References

See also 
 Member of the Legislative Assembly (India)

Jhunjhunu district
Assembly constituencies of Rajasthan